The Men's marathon B1 was a marathon event in athletics at the 1988 Summer Paralympics, for totally blind athletes. It was the first time marathon events for blind or visually impaired athletes were held at the Paralympic Games; the marathon had been introduced to the Paralympics in 1984, but had then been held only for wheelchair athletes. The men's 1988 B1 marathon  was contested by six athletes from six countries. Norway's Joerund Gaasemyr won by a clear margin, in 2:45:48, quarter of an hour ahead of his competitors, who all completed the race in three hours or more.

Results

See also
 Marathon at the Paralympics

References 

Men's marathon B1
1988 marathons
Marathons at the Paralympics
Men's marathons